The Audi Q8 e-tron, formerly the Audi e-tron is a battery electric mid-size luxury crossover produced by Audi since 2019. The e-tron was unveiled as a concept car at the 2015 Frankfurt Motor Show. The final production version was revealed in San Francisco on 17 September 2018, publicly debuted at the 2018 Paris Motor Show, and was first delivered in May 2019. It is the company's first battery electric mass production car. The Sportback variant, a coupe style of the e-tron, entered production in 2020. In 2022, the e-tron was renamed the Audi Q8 e-tron and the SQ8 in both regular and Sportback body styles with the facelift.

History 
The Audi e-tron is based on the e-tron quattro concept that was unveiled at the 2015 Frankfurt Motor Show. The Sportback variant has  of EPA range, entered production in early 2020.

The car's certification in Germany by the KBA (Federal Motor Transport Authority) was not obtained until required changes were made to the car's software. In January 2019, United States market deliveries were due to commence in June.

The first customer in Germany received his e-tron in March 2019. In late April 2019 it was reported that prospective customers faced waiting lists of 6–7 months (putting the expected delivery date close to the end of 2019). The delays caused controversy in Norway, where customers were informed that their cars would be delivered up to 6 months later than originally promised unless they paid extra for a significantly more expensive "Fast Track" car. Further to this, some customers were also informed that were they to cancel their reservation they would be liable for a fine equal to 8% of the purchase price.

In Norway, the e-tron was the best-selling car or truck of any kind in October 2019. In November 2019, it ranked #3. It was also the best-selling car or truck of any kind in Norway in the year 2020, outselling the Tesla Model 3.

In the Netherlands, the e-tron was the #2 most registered car of any kind in December 2019.

In 2020 the New Zealand government started purchasing e-trons as official government cars.

Audi paused production of the e-tron in February 2020 due to supply chain problems including issues with adequate supply of batteries for the e-tron. Production resumed in early May.

In 2022, Audi announced that the facelifted e-tron will be renamed to Audi Q8 e-tron (unrelated to the existing Audi Q8) which was revealed at 9 November 2022.

Specifications

The Audi e-tron is powered by a 95 kWh battery pack, of which 86.5 kWh (formerly 83.6 kWh) is usable. It can be charged from zero to 80% in around 30 minutes using 150 kW DC fast-chargers. For home charging in the EU, a standard 11 kW charger recharges the pack in 8.5 hours, while an optional 22 kW charger halves this time. In the US, a 40A 9.6kW J1772 charger is used instead. A thermal management system (also serving the motors and power electronics) keeps the battery between 23–35 degrees Celsius, and battery modules (twelve 60 Ah cells each) can be replaced.

The quattro electric all-wheel drive uses two electric motors, one mounted in the front and one in the rear.

The car uses an energy recuperation system which, on average, contributes 30% to the range. Recuperation can be achieved both when the driver releases the accelerator and when applying pressure to the brake pedal.

When equipped with the virtual side mirrors the car has a drag coefficient of 0.27.

Cold-weather performance

The real winter range drop might be slightly higher, because in the aforementioned tests the "winter" car had the advantage of more aerodynamic wheels than the "summer" car.

This stands well in comparison to other EVs.

The e-tron is, in summer driving, less efficient than the Tesla Model X in terms of distance per kWh of energy. However the e-tron is less affected by low temperatures, so driving in the winter brings the results of these two vehicles closer. In a test done at temperatures in the  range and including high-speed highway driving, the e-tron's efficiency was about 12.4% worse than in the Model X. In slightly below-freezing conditions, the difference was smaller and the e-tron's efficiency was only about 8.6% worse than in the Model X.

Charging
The e-tron can be charged at an effective rate of 150 kW using a 175 kW charger. This is possible in a wide state-of-charge window, until the battery is about 80% charged. With such a charger, adding  of range takes only 10 minutes. Audi of America is more cautious with their estimates, saying that  of range can be added in 10 minutes when using a 150 kW charger.

At 90%, charging rate is about 82 kW and it remains above 50 kW until reaching 100%.

Using a 50 kW charger, the car can be charged at a constant rate of 50 kW, up until reaching 100%.

Equipment

Standard equipment for the e-tron includes 12-way heated and ventilated front seats, a panoramic moonroof, and 20-inch wheels. Upgrades include massage seats, power door closers, leather upholstery, 21-inch wheels and orange brake calipers. The interior is in line with other Audi models with a 10.1-inch infotainment screen, a smaller 8.6-inch touchscreen display, Amazon Alexa voice control, Virtual Cockpit system, and an optional head up display. Other equipments include a Bang & Olufsen sound system, and an available Driver Assistance package with enhanced adaptive cruise control, automatic parking assist and night vision. The e-tron is the second production car to offer optional virtual side mirrors, which replaces the traditional side-view mirrors and instead use cameras transmitting images to a high-contrast 7-inch OLED embedded in the door panels.

Sportback version

In addition to the conventional SUV body style, Audi released a 'Sportback' version with a sloping rear part of the roof, similar to the BMW X6 and the Mercedes-Benz GLE Coupe. Audi decided to compete with these ICE-powered rivals by offering only a pure electric vehicle.

Comparisons to the styling of the Audi A7 have also been made.

The production version debuted at AutoMobility LA in Los Angeles in November 2019. The length and width are the same as in the standard model, while the height is  lower. A drag coefficient is lower than in the standard model (0.25 vs. 0.27), while the powertrain and battery are the same as in the original model.

It is better than in the 2019 e-tron conventional SUV, partially because a larger percentage of the battery capacity is usable. The e-tron's battery management system keeps part of the battery capacity as a buffer, which is not part of the usable capacity; now the size of that buffer is decreased to unlock more usable capacity. This change (as well as some others like reducing usage of the AWD mode) was introduced in the e-tron conventional SUV during the production run; while the Sportback already had these modifications when it first went on the market.

It entered production in early 2020 and became available in Europe and in the US in 2020.

Models

Marketing
The e-tron logo can be seen in the last scene of Iron Man 3 but the car is not revealed, probably since it wasn't publicly released as concept by then.
The e-tron made an appearance in an Audi commercial tied to Avengers: Endgame, where it was introduced to Captain Marvel who was briefed about the events of Avengers: Infinity War and the things that had changed on Earth while she was gone, although it never made an appearance in the movie itself. Later, the e-tron appeared in Spider-Man: Far From Home where it was used by characters played by Samuel L. Jackson and Cobie Smulders.
e-Tron will appear in Grand Theft Auto Online as part of the update The Contract under the name Obey I-Wagen.

Production issues and recall
Reports surfaced in April 2019 that the e-tron was subject to production delays and a cut in production targets due to supply of batteries and electric motors. Subsequently, weekly production hours at the assembly plant were foreseen to be reduced from 30 to 24.
Audi announced a recall of certain e-tron models in early June 2019. The recall relates to a water leak that could lead to the high voltage electronics shorting, potentially causing a fire in extreme cases.

Markets

Asia-Pacific

Australia 
The e-tron and e-tron Sportback were launched in Australia in 2020. Prices start from AU$137,100 plus on-road costs (50 quattro) and AU$146,100 plus on-road costs (55 quattro).

The e-tron has a 5 star ANCAP Safety Rating as tested in July 2019.

Pakistan 
The e-tron was launched in Pakistan in 2020. It is the best selling electric car in Pakistan and Audi's most successful car in Pakistan.

Thailand 
The e-tron will be launched in Thailand by Meister Technik in 2019. On 15 October 2020, the e-tron Sportback will be introduced as well.

North America

Canada 
The vehicle went on sale in Canada in 2019. The price starts at CA$ 90,000.

Mexico 
The e-tron will be launched in Mexico for the 2021 model year. It will be priced at MXN$1,919,900.

United States 
Deliveries to American customers started in early 2019. There were 3,540 e-trons registered in the United States during the first three quarters of 2019, ahead of Germany (2,997 units), though still less than in Norway (3,824 units).

Notes

References

e-tron
Production electric cars
All-wheel-drive vehicles
Cars introduced in 2018
2020s cars